Bartosz Wolski (born April 6, 1980 in Kraków, Poland) is an American sprint canoer who competed in the mid-2000s. At the 2004 Summer Olympics in Athens, he was eliminated in the semifinals of the K-2 500 m event.

References
 Sports-Reference.com profile

1980 births
American male canoeists
Canoeists at the 2004 Summer Olympics
Living people
Olympic canoeists of the United States
Sportspeople from Kraków
Polish emigrants to the United States